Amphimallon ruficorne is a species of beetle in the Melolonthinae subfamily that can be found in Bosnia and Herzegovina, Hungary, Romania, the Netherlands and Ukraine.

References

Beetles described in 1775
ruficorne
Beetles of Europe
Taxa named by Johan Christian Fabricius